Jemelka is a Czech surname, its female form is Jemelková. Notable people with the surname include:

Miroslav Jemelka (born 1931), Czechoslovak sprint canoeist
Otto Jemelka (1914–2008), Czechoslovak modern pentathlete
Václav Jemelka (born 1995), Czech footballer

Czech-language surnames